Susan McKelvie (born 15 June 1985) is a female hammer thrower from Edinburgh, Scotland. She is currently ranked first in Scotland, and throws for Edinburgh Athletic Club, Scotland and Great Britain. She represented her country at the 2014 Commonwealth Games in Glasgow. Currently a PE teacher, she is training with Alan Bertram.

References

1985 births
Living people
Sportspeople from Edinburgh
British female hammer throwers
Scottish female hammer throwers
Commonwealth Games competitors for Scotland
Athletes (track and field) at the 2014 Commonwealth Games